USS Kalamazoo may refer to:

, was a monitor laid down in 1863 and never completed. She was renamed Colossus on 15 June 1869 and broken up for scrap in 1884
, was a  laid down 7 July 1944 and transferred to Colombia 26 November 1947
 was an oiler laid down in 1970 and decommissioned in 1996

United States Navy ship names